Luz de Peña Matos Estévez, commonly known by her stage name Lina Salomé, is a Cuban-born Mexican dancer and actress.

Filmography

References

External links

Living people
Mexican female dancers
Mexican film actresses
Cuban emigrants to Mexico
Golden Age of Mexican cinema
Year of birth missing (living people)